Rajadhi may refer to 

 Rajadhi Raja (1989 film), a 1989 Tamil film
 Rajadhi Raja (1992 film), a 1992 Kannada film
 Rajadhi Raja (2009 film), a 2009 Tamil film
 Rajadhi Raja (2014 film), a 2014 Malayalam film
 Sri Rajadhi Rajasinha of Kandy, King of Kandy in 1782